Uniola is a genus of New World plants in the grass family.

 Species
 Uniola condensata Hitchc. - Ecuador
 Uniola paniculata L. – sea oats - coastal regions in southeastern United States (TX LA MS AL GA FL NC SC VA DE), Mexico (Tamaulipas, Veracruz, Tabasco, Yucatán Peninsula); Nicaragua, Panamá, Bahamas, Turks & Caicos, Cuba, Hispaniola
 Uniola peruviana Lægaard & Sánchez Vega - Perú
 Uniola pittieri Hack. - Mexico, Central America, Venezuela, Colombia, Peru, Ecuador incl Galápagos
 Uniola virgata (Poir.) Griseb. - West Indies incl Bahamas

 Formerly included

References

External links
 
 

 
Poaceae genera
Grasses of North America
Grasses of South America
Taxa named by Carl Linnaeus
Taxonomy articles created by Polbot